Speller may refer to:

 A book used for proper spelling
 A participant in a spelling bee
 Speller (surname)